Dahleez or Dehleez may refer to:
 Dahleez (film), a 1986 Indian Bollywood film
 Dehleez (1981 TV series), a Pakistani television series
 Dehleez (2009 TV series), an Indian Hindi-language television series
 Dahleez (2016 TV series), an Indian legal drama series